Mick Rogers (born Michael Oldroyd, 20 September 1946, Dovercourt, Essex, England) is an English rock guitarist, singer and songwriter, chiefly known for his time with Manfred Mann's Earth Band from 1971 to 1975 and again since 1984.

Early life and career

His father was a drummer and his uncle a string bass player. The young Rogers was weaned on his uncle's jazz collection and 1950s rock and roll. Before MMEB he was a member of The Vision, which backed Adam Faith, and the Australian bands The Playboys, Bulldog, and Procession.

First period with Manfred Mann's Earth Band

Departure from Manfred Mann's Earth Band

He left the Earth Band because he wanted to steer the band more in the direction of Frank Zappa, which created friction with Mann.

After his initial departure from MMEB in 1975, he returned to Australia to work and then returned to the UK, where he formed the band Aviator with drummer Clive Bunker. They released two albums.

Return to Manfred Mann's Earth Band

Later projects

During his second tenure with the Earth Band (that continues to this day), Rogers released a handful of solo albums. His solo debut Back to Earth got a mixed review on the German Babyblaue Prog-Reviews, which praised Rogers' vocal and guitar work but criticized the fact that he was not accompanied by other musicians and instead relied on programmed drums. Father of Day was described on the same site as a maxi single, which shared its parent album's qualities and shortcomings.

Sharabang, recorded in the Austrian Alps, featured Matt & Gregg Bissonette and was mixed by Chuck Ainlay. The album got a positive review from RockTimes, praising authentic and solid work and giving a lot of attention to Rogers' own compositions such as "Cutting Me to Pieces". A similarly positive review was published by Musik an sich, giving the album 15 out of 20 stars. Reviewer Jürgen Weber lauded Rogers' rendition of "I Heard It Through the Grapevine" and also pointed out "Cutting Me to Pieces" as a highlight, but noted that the album could have done with more original songs and more uptempo material.

Musicreviews.de was more reserved in its review, again praising the Rammstein-esque "Cutting Me to Pieces" as well as Rogers's vocals, but criticizing some soft songs in the second half and the too obvious choice of covers. According to Rogers himself, he would've preferred to cover obscure songs from the 1950s and tracks by Ornette Coleman, but his label preferred more accessible song choices such as "The Joker". He also later denounced his non-album Christmas release from 2012, a cover of the John Lennon / Yoko Ono song Happy Xmas (War Is Over), saying he was sponsored to do it, but wouldn't do it again because it wasn't his style.

During the initial years with Manfred Mann's Earth Band, Mick Rogers was the only guitarist and chief lead vocalist in the group. When he returned in 1984, he shared vocal and guitar duties with Chris Thompson until Thompson's exit. The band effectively stopped existing after the release of Masque in 1987 but a new formation was formed in the early 1990s. Chris Thompson's parts and several new songs were now sung by Noel McCalla, whereas Rogers mostly only sang lead on "Father of Day, Father of Night", "Joybringer" and some verses on "Spirits in the Night" and "Mighty Quinn". This pattern did not change through further line-ups; Rogers is once again the band's main guitarist (current vocalist Robert Hart intermittently plays guitar) but never sings more than a handful of vocal parts, which in recent times have typically included a stripped-down version of "Do Wah Diddy Diddy".

In 2020, Rogers planned to play material of the early Earth Band with original member Colin Pattenden and keyboardist Mike Keneally at the Burg Herzberg Festival under the moniker "Solar Fire", however this didn't happen due to the COVID-19 pandemic. The appearance was rescheduled twice and planned for 2022.

Mick Rogers lives in Surrey and has three kids. In a 2019 interview, he explained his opposition to Brexit ("Make that a headline: Mick Rogers does not want out of the EU").

Discography
Back to Earth (2002)
Father of Day (2003)
Sharabang (2013)

References

External links

 
 Discogs.com

English rock guitarists
English rock singers
1946 births
Living people
Manfred Mann's Earth Band members
Greenslade members